DJ Anjali & The Incredible Kid is an American DJ duo, formed in 2000 in Portland, Oregon. The duo consists of Anjali Hursh (DJ Anjali) and Stephen Strausbaugh (The Incredible Kid). In addition to appearing at various venues in Portland's nightclub scene, the act has performed in numerous music festivals and resident nights including Sasquatch! Music Festival and Basement Bhangra and is credited with helping to bring South Asian and Latin dance music to the club scene in Portland and the greater Pacific Northwest. Together they host Tropitaal, a "Desi-Latino Soundclash" and Andaz, the longest-running Bhangra and Bollywood dance party in the United States. The duo was awarded first place in the "Best DJ" category of "Best of Portland" by Willamette Week readers in 2016 and 2017.

History 
Hursh and Strausbaugh first crossed paths in the late 90's when they both became involved in union organizing while working at Powell's Books. At the time Strausbaugh was playing sets at private parties and providing entertainment at pro-union events. After collaborating on several such events, the two formed a partnership and made their first foray into the nightclub scene in 2000, hosting a successful new years party at Medicine Hat. This was followed by brief stints at The Blackbird and Lola's Room, until 2002 when they took over a monthly night at Fez Ballroom, the venue that would become home to their Andaz party for the next 7.5 years. Since departing from that venue in April 2010, editions of Andaz have been held at Star Theater, The Analog, and The Liquor Store and have routinely drawn crowds of 300 people.

In 2003, they teamed up with DJ E3 to form Atlas, a dance party that combined their South Asian format with a more broadly international sound that included Dancehall, Reggaeton, Baile Funk, and other genres. The series lasted 10 years. At the time this was the longest of any resident night ever at Holocene, and it played host to many national and international touring acts such as Toy Selectah, Poirier, and J Boogie. It was at the end of this run that they launched their new series, Tropitaal at the Goodfoot Pub & Lounge in Portland's Kerns Neighborhood. The night is described as a "Desi/Latino Soundclash". Hursh and Strausbaugh have taken Tropitaal on the road, holding editions of the series in Seattle and Oakland.

Reception 
The duo's unusual career path has attracted attention from the international press, with coverage in The Times Of India and GQ India. Reviews note the contrast between their parties and the more mainstream Indian dance club events found elsewhere, pointing out the greater emphasis on bhangra and the queer-friendly, mixed-race audience.

In 2021, Anjali's likeness was featured on a bus wrap affixed to TriMet buses as part of a campaign to celebrate Portland's AAPI history and leaders.

Festivals & Guest Appearances 

 Sasquatch! Music Festival
 Decibel Festival
 MusicfestNW
 Beloved Festival
 Matatu
 Photosynthesis Festival
 Soul'd Out Music Festival
 Fairytale Music Festival
 Kaleidoscope Music Festival
 Oregon Country Fair
 Indian Summer
 Bhangratheque
 Non Stop Bhangra
 Basement Bhangra
 iBomba
 Ottomania
 Vancouver Queer Film Festival
 Vancouver International Bhangra Celebration

References

External links 
 Official Website
 Kabhi Khushi Kabhie Kush radio program

Living people
Musicians from Portland, Oregon
Club DJs
Women DJs
Electronic dance music DJs
American DJs
Year of birth missing (living people)